AsteroidOS is an open source operating system designed for smartwatches. It is available as a firmware replacement for some Android Wear devices. The motto for the AsteroidOS project is "Free your wrist."

Wareable.com reviewed version 1.0 and gave it 3.5 out of 5 stars.

Software Architecture 
AsteroidOS is built like an embedded Linux distribution with OpenEmbedded. It works on top of the Linux kernel and the systemd service manager. AsteroidOS also includes various mobile Linux middlewares originally developed for Mer and Nemo Mobile such as lipstick and MCE.

The user interface is completely written with the Qt5 framework. Applications are coded in QML with graphic components coming from Qt Quick and QML-Asteroid. An SDK with a cross-compilation toolchain integrated to Qt Creator can be generated from OpenEmbedded for easier development.

Asteroid-launcher is a Wayland compositor and customizable home screen managing applications, watchfaces, notifications and quick settings. Asteroid-launcher runs on top of the libhybris compatibility layer to make use of Bionic GPU drivers.

AsteroidOS offers Bluetooth Low Energy synchronization capabilities with the asteroid-btsyncd daemon running on top of BlueZ5. A reference client named AsteroidOS Sync is available for Android users.

Shipped Applications 
As of the 1.0 release, the following applications are shipped and pre-installed by default in AsteroidOS:
 Agenda: Provides simple event scheduling capabilities
 Alarm Clock: Makes the watch vibrate at a specific time of day
 Calculator: Allows basic calculations
 Music: Controls a synchronized device's music player
 Settings: Configures time, date, language, Bluetooth, brightness, wallpapers, watchfaces and USB
 Stopwatch: Measures an elapsed time
 Timer: Counts down a specified time interval
 Weather: Provides weather forecast for five days

See also 

 Wear OS
 Sailfish OS
 OpenEmbedded
 Hybris (software)
 Qt (software)

References

Smartwatches
Wearable computers
Free software operating systems
Mobile operating systems